Wanaloset or Wanalosett may refer to:

People
A variant spelling of Wonalancet (ca. 1619-1697), a Native American leader

Ships
USS Wanaloset (1865), also spelled USS Wanalosett, a United States Navy sloop-of-war of 1865 that appears never to have been laid down and for which only the engines were completed